Route 922, or Highway 922, may refer to:

Canada
Saskatchewan Highway 922

Costa Rica
 National Route 922

India
 National Highway 922 (India)

United Kingdom
 A922 road

United States